Black and White Farm Barn is a historic barn located near Sonyea in Livingston County, New York. It is a large two story wood-frame building built in 1884 on a  farm.

It was listed on the National Register of Historic Places in 1988.

References

Barns on the National Register of Historic Places in New York (state)
Houses completed in 1884
Buildings and structures in Livingston County, New York
National Register of Historic Places in Livingston County, New York